Inward Fire is an album by saxophonist Clifford Jordan which was recorded in New York City in 1977 and released on the Muse label.

Reception

The Allmusic site rated the album with 4 stars.

Track listing 
All compositions by Clifford Jordan except as indicated
 "Inward Fire" - 6:40  
 "Abracadabra" - 6:41  
 "The Look" (Dizzy Reece) - 8:12  
 "Toy" - 6:08  
 "Buddy Bolden's Call" - 7:00  
 "Eat at Joe's" (Reece) - 9:25

Personnel 
Clifford Jordan - tenor saxophone, flute
Dizzy Reece - trumpet
Howard Johnson - tuba
Pat Patrick - tenor saxophone, flute
Muhal Richard Abrams - piano
Jimmy Ponder - guitar
Richard Davis - bass
Louis Hayes, Grover Everette - drums
Azzedine Weston - congas
Donna Jewel Jordan (track 2), Joe Lee Wilson (track 5) - vocals

References 

Clifford Jordan albums
1978 albums
Muse Records albums